The 2021 Sun Belt Conference Football Championship Game was a college football game played on December 4, 2021, at Cajun Field in Lafayette, Louisiana. It was the third edition of the Sun Belt Conference Football Championship Game and determined the champion of the Sun Belt Conference for the 2021 season. The game began at 2:40 p.m. CST and aired on ESPN. The game featured the Appalachian State Mountaineers, the East Division champions, and the Louisiana Ragin' Cajuns, the West Division champions. Sponsored by tire company Hercules Tires, the game was officially known as the 2021 Hercules Tires Sun Belt Football Championship.

Previous season
The 2020 Sun Belt Conference Football Championship Game was set to have Coastal Carolina face Louisiana. However the game was cancelled due to a positive COVID-19 test in the Coastal Carolina program.

Teams
Appalachian State and Louisiana have faced each other in every other Sun Belt Championship Game held. Since the move to divisions, Appalachian State has won Sun Belt’s East Division three times, while Louisiana has won the West four times. Appalachian State has won both previous matchups in the Championship Game. This was the first Sun Belt Championship held in Lafayette, Louisiana.

Appalachian State

Appalachian State clinched a spot in the Sun Belt title game following their 45–7 win over Troy.

Louisiana

Louisiana clinched a spot in the Sun Belt title game following their 21–17 win over Georgia State.

Game summary

Statistics

References

External links
Game statistics at statbroadcast.com

Championship
Sun Belt Conference Football Championship Game
Appalachian State Mountaineers football games
Louisiana Ragin' Cajuns football games
Sun Belt Conference Football
Sun Belt Conference Football Championship